A glycosyl acceptor is any suitable nucleophile-containing molecule that will react with a glycosyl donor to form a new glycosidic bond. By convention, the acceptor is the member of this pair which did not contain the resulting anomeric carbon of the new glycosidic bond. Since the nucleophilic atom of the acceptor is typically an oxygen atom, this can be remembered using the mnemonic of the acceptor is the alcohol. A glycosyl acceptor can be a mono- or oligosaccharide that contains an available nucleophile, such as an unprotected hydroxyl.

Background

Examples 
glucose to haemoglobin

See also
 Chemical glycosylation
 Glycosyl halide
 Armed and disarmed saccharides
 Carbohydrate chemistry

References

Carbohydrate chemistry
Organic reactions